The Khuen (or Khuen, Kuan, Kuanhua, Kween, Khween, Khouen) people are an aboriginal ethnic group of Laos.

Language
The Khuen speak a language also called Khuen, which is a Khmuic language. The Khmuic languages are Austro-Asiatic. There is some debate as to whether the Khmuic languages are of the Mon-Khmer branch, but the majority opinion is that they are not.

Geographic distribution
Population in Laos:  8000 in Luang Namtha Province
Population in China:  1500, centered on Jinghong in Southern China
Population in United States:  Unknown

Customs
As a fellow member of the larger Khmuic ethnic group, many aspects of Khuen culture are similar to the Khmu.  Family names are usually the names of sacred animals or plants. It is taboo for a Khuen person to touch the animal or plant that bears his or her family name.

Religion
In addition to Theravada Buddhism, they also worship a hierarchy of demons and ghosts.  Ancestor worship is also practiced.

References

Ethnic groups in Laos
Ethnic groups in China
Khmuic peoples